Glypican-1 (GPC1) is a protein that in humans is encoded by the GPC1 gene. GPC1 is encoded by human GPC1 gene located at 2q37.3. GPC1 contains 558 amino acids with three predicted heparan sulfate chains.

Function 

Cell surface heparan sulfate proteoglycans are composed of a membrane-associated protein core substituted with three heparan sulfate chains. Members of the glypican-related integral membrane proteoglycan family (GRIPS) contain a core protein anchored to the cytoplasmic membrane via a glycosyl phosphatidylinositol linkage.  These proteins may play a role in the control of cell division and growth regulation.

Interactions 

Glypican 1 has been shown to interact with SLIT2.

Clinical significance 

This protein is involved in the misfolding of normal prion proteins in the cell membrane to the infectious prion form.

In 2015 it was reported that the presence of this protein in exosomes in patients' blood is able to detect early pancreatic cancer with absolute specificity and sensitivity. However this conclusion is disputed. and in more recent overviews of potential markers for pancreatic cancer, Glypican 1 is not mentioned.

GPC1 has been evaluated as a potential target for cancer therapy, including antibody-drug conjugates, CAR-T cell therapy, radiotherapy, bispecific T cell engager and immunotoxins in preclinical studies.

See also 
 Glypican

References

Further reading